M36, M-36 or M.36 may refer to:

Military
 , a Royal Navy mine countermeasures vessel
 M36 tank destroyer, a World War II and Korean War US Army tank destroyer
 M89SR sniper rifle, first introduced as the Sardius M36 Sniper Weapon System in the 1980s
 Bofors M36, an anti-aircraft autocannon
 Bulgarian M36 helmet, of the Bulgarian Army prior to and during World War II
 Panssarimiina m/36, a Finnish anti-tank mine
 Skoda 75 mm Model 1936 (75 mm M.36), a mountain artillery gun
 M36, a variant of the US Army M35 series 2½-ton 6×6 cargo truck
 M36, the engine for the Leichttraktor, a German 1930s experimental tank
 M36 Burster, a warhead of the US Army M55 rocket
 M36 Captive Flight Training Missile, used for training on the handling of the AGM-114 Hellfire
 Modell 1936, a German World War II uniform
 M36 Patrol Boat, Royal Thai navy patrol boat

Transportation
Airports and train stations
 Frank Federer Memorial Airport, see List of airports in Arkansas
 Jigozen Station, in Jigozen, Hatsukaichi, Hiroshima, Japan
 Muroran Station, in Muroran, Hokkaido, Japan

Roads
 M-36 (Michigan highway), a state highway
 M36 (Cape Town), a Metropolitan Route in Cape Town, South Africa
 M36 (Johannesburg), a Metropolitan Route in Johannesburg, South Africa
 M36 (Pretoria), a Metropolitan Route in Pretoria, South Africa
 M36 Highway (Kazakhstan), part of AH7 (Asian Highway 7)

Vehicles
 ICAR M.36 Comercial, a Willy Messerschmitt-designed airliner, of which one was built in the 1930s
 New South Wales M36 class locomotive
 Progress M-36, a Russian spacecraft

Medicine and science
 Messier 36, an open star cluster in the constellation Auriga
 M36, a sub-strain of the Vollum strain of the anthrax bacterium
 M36, a subclade of Haplogroup M (mtDNA)

Other uses
 British NVC community M36, a mire community; see Mires in the British National Vegetation Classification system
 Symphony No. 3 (Szymanowski), M36 in the Michałowski catalogue
 M36, an Egyptian hieroglyph; see List of Egyptian hieroglyphs § M36
 M36, a metric screw thread standardised in ISO 965

See also
 36M, a variant of the British Mills bomb hand grenade